Hot Frustrations (also known as I Am a Fugitive from a White Slave Gang and Frustrations) is a 1965 French-Italian drama film written and directed by Georges Combret.

Cast
Reine Rohan as Marisa
Magali Noël as Louisa
Paul Guers as Jean
Jean-Marc Tennberg as Mario
Evelyne Boursotti as Edith
Jean-Louis Tristan as Bob
Françoise Deldick
Umberto D'Orsi
Giacomo Furia
Piero Gerlini

External links
 

1965 films
French drama films
Italian drama films
1960s French-language films
Films directed by Georges Combret
1960s French films
1960s Italian films